A casual courier is an everyday traveler who informally delivers packages for shippers. The term describes an alternative delivery practice of sending items from one place to another via independent traveler.

Casual couriers usually have existing travel plans before agreeing to deliver a package for a sender.

Casual couriers may receive a fee directly from the shipper for delivering a package to its destination. The casual courier's fee is typically significantly lower than traditional overnight delivery services.

Delivering packages for others is a common practice around the world, especially among close-knit ethnic communities In the Philippines, for example, the Tagalog word "Pakidala" means "can you take a package for me?"

Delivery costs can be substantially reduced by using a casual courier and for the courier, carrying a package may help to subsidize the cost of a trip.

Casual couriers vs. air couriers
A casual courier is very different from an air courier. Typically, air couriers work for traditional courier companies as employees and may receive discounted airline tickets. Air couriers are very limited when it comes to dates of travel, destination, trip duration and baggage.

In contrast, casual couriers are completely independent travelers. They purchase their own transportation to the destination of their choosing and are not limited by their casual deliveries. Furthermore, if casual couriers are not invited to deliver a package, then they travel anyway, as previously planned. Unlike air courier delivery, casual couriers are not restricted to air travel; they deliver packages around the corner or around the globe, by train buses and air and ship.

See also
 Bike courier
 Post riders
 Mail carrier
 FedEx
 UPS
 DHL
 USPS
 Mail
 The Casual Courier

Transport occupations